(Big) Bone Cave is a cave located in Van Buren County, Tennessee, in the community of Bone Cave that is named after it. It is notable both for its history and current recreational use. It is listed on the National Register of Historic Places and a designated National Natural Landmark. It is a  State Natural Area managed by Rock Island State Park. It is named for the discovery of the bones of a giant ground sloth in 1811. The cave was operated as a saltpeter mine, notably during the War of 1812 and the American Civil War. A variety of natural remains and human artifacts have been well preserved in the dry atmosphere of the cave. The cave is the 10th longest mapped cave in Tennessee.

Big Bone Cave formed in Mississippian Montegeale limestone originally on the western escarpment of the Cumberland Plateau. The cave formed prior to 5.7 ±1.09 Ma based in cosmogenic radionuclide dating of pebbles washed into the Muster Ground room. Long passages formed during a long period of water table stability when the climate was warmer and sea levels were higher reducing erosion throughout the Mississippi drainage. At the time, the Cumberland River flowed across the Highland Rim before the formation of the Nashville Basin. Global cooling 3.2-3.1 Ma triggered a  sea-level drop which increased erosion (incision) up the Mississippi River and led to the Cumberland River cutting into the Highland Rim and its headwaters, the Collins River, cutting into the Cumberland Plateau. The lower water table would have drained the water filling the caverns. Further erosion isolated Bone Cave Mountain from the Cumberland Plateau.

Notes

Further reading
 Smyre, John L. and Zawislak, Ronald L., Big Bone and the Caves of Bone Cave Mountain, (2007) Rocky River Press, Rock Island Tennessee,  .
 Matthews, Larry E. Big Bone Cave, (2006) National Speleological Society, .
 Barr, Thomas C., Jr., Caves Of Tennessee, (1961) Bulletin 64 of the Tennessee Division of Geology, See pages 451-460.

External links

 Rock Island State Park
 Natural Area Map
 National Natural Landmarks
 NSS Geo2 Long & Deep Caves

Archaeological sites on the National Register of Historic Places in Tennessee
Caves of Tennessee
Wild caves
National Natural Landmarks in Tennessee
State parks of Tennessee
Protected areas of Van Buren County, Tennessee
Landforms of Van Buren County, Tennessee
National Register of Historic Places in Van Buren County, Tennessee
Mines in Tennessee